Wat Ratchaburana is a Buddhist temple (wat) in the Ayutthaya Historical Park, Ayutthaya, Thailand. The temple's main prang is one of the finest in the city. Located in the island section of Ayutthaya, Wat Ratchaburana is immediately north of Wat Mahathat.

History
Wat Ratchaburana was founded in 1424 by King Borommarachathirat II of the Ayutthaya Kingdom and built on the cremation site of his two elder brothers. The two brothers had fought to their deaths in a duel for the royal succession to their father Intha Racha.

In 1957 the temple's crypt was looted of a large number of Buddha images and gold artifacts. The thieves were later caught, but few of the treasures were recovered. Some that were recovered are now housed in the nearby Chao Sam Phraya Museum. Subsequent excavations of the crypt have uncovered many more rare Buddha images.

Architecture and art
The temple's central prang has undergone restoration. Original stucco work can be seen, for example Garuda swooping down on nāga. Other mythical creatures as well as lotus are featured. Four Sri Lankan stupas surround the main prang.

The prang's crypt, accessible by steep stairs, houses faded frescoes. These comprise some of the rare such examples from the early Ayutthaya period. The crypt's Buddha images, now housed in the Chao Sam Phraya Museum, exhibit both Khmer and Sukhothai influences.

Image gallery

References

Buddhist temples in Phra Nakhon Si Ayutthaya Province
Tourist attractions in Phra Nakhon Si Ayutthaya province